William Endfield Steinberg (born February 26, 1950) is an American songwriter. He achieved his greatest success in the 1980s with songwriting partner Tom Kelly; together they wrote or co-wrote the No. 1 hits "Like a Virgin" by Madonna (1984), "True Colors" by Cyndi Lauper (1986), "Eternal Flame" by the Bangles (1989), "So Emotional" by Whitney Houston (1987) and "Alone" (covered by Heart in 1987). They also wrote or co-wrote the hit songs "I Drove All Night" (recorded by various artists, initially recorded by Roy Orbison in 1987 but first released by Cyndi Lauper in 1989), "I Touch Myself" by Divinyls (1990), and "I'll Stand by You" by The Pretenders (1994).

After Kelly retired from music in the 1990s, Steinberg collaborated with other songwriters. With Rick Nowels and Marie-Claire D'Ubaldo he wrote the hit songs "Falling Into You" (covered by Celine Dion) and "One & One". He has written hit songs with Josh Alexander including "All About Us" by t.A.T.u. (2005), "Too Little Too Late" by JoJo (2006) and "Give Your Heart a Break" by Demi Lovato (2012).

Biography

Early life
Steinberg grew up in Fresno, California and moved to Palm Springs, California when he was 12 and worked with his father's table grape operation. He attended Cate School in California, and Bard College in New York.

Music career
In his mid-20s, he formed the group Billy Thermal, which eventually was signed to Richard Perry's Planet Records.

Their breakthrough occurred in 1980 when Linda Ronstadt heard their album and decided to record their song "How Do I Make You?" for her 1980 Mad Love album. The album hit the top three of the charts and went platinum, and Ronstadt's version of their song reached the American top 10.

Pat Benatar, on her 1980 album Crimes of Passion, covered another Billy Thermal song, "I'm Gonna Follow You". In 1981, Steinberg wrote "Precious Time", which became the title track for Benatar's album Precious Time. Also that year, Steinberg began writing with Tom Kelly, who had written another song ("Fire and Ice") on the album for Benatar.

Further success followed with the song "Like a Virgin", when it was played for Warner Bros. executives who thought it would be perfect for Madonna. Steinberg later recalled writing the lyric in 1983 following a failed relationship, stating that he had genuinely felt that he'd 'made it through the wilderness' and that he was 'beat, incomplete'. Madonna's version of the song spent six weeks at number one in the United States in 1985 and became a worldwide hit. It was also the title track for her number one album.

The success of the partnership continued with more number one singles, "True Colors" (recorded by Cyndi Lauper), "So Emotional" (by Whitney Houston), "Eternal Flame" (by The Bangles) and "Alone" (by Heart).

Their other hits include "In Your Room" (The Bangles), 'Spirit of Love' (by Laura Branigan), "I Drove All Night" (recorded by Roy Orbison, Cyndi Lauper and Celine Dion), "I Touch Myself" (Divinyls), 'Sex as a Weapon' (by Pat Benatar), and 'Look Me in the Heart' (by Tina Turner). They also wrote several songs with Chrissie Hynde of The Pretenders, including the top-10 single "I'll Stand By You". Artists such as REO Speedwagon, Cheap Trick, Bette Midler, Belinda Carlisle, and Taylor Dayne (on her multi-platinum debut album "Tell It to My Heart") also recorded their songs.

In the mid 1990s, Steinberg began writing with Rick Nowels, who had established himself as a songwriter for artists such as Stevie Nicks and Belinda Carlisle. Their greatest success of the period was the Celine Dion recording of "Falling into You". In 1997, Steinberg co-wrote the track "One & One" with Rick Nowels and Marie-Claire D'Ubaldo for Edyta Górniak, and this song became a hit in Europe and Asia, leading Edyta as the first Polish singer in the Music & Media's European Radio Top 50 airplay chart.

In 2005, Steinberg collaborated with producer Josh Alexander and Jessica and Lisa Origliasso of The Veronicas to write several tracks for The Veronicas' debut release, The Secret Life Of..., including the third single, "When It All Falls Apart". Steinberg and Alexander also wrote "All About Us", a hit for the Russian pop duo t.A.T.u. They wrote JoJo's 2006 single "Too Little Too Late" and Leigh Nash's "Nervous in the Light of Dawn" and "My Idea of Heaven", and Katharine McPhee's "Over It" in 2007. In 2008, Steinberg and Alexander wrote "Fly on the Wall" for t.A.T.u.'s album Happy Smiles. He wrote songs with Alexander on JoJo's scrapped album All I Want Is Everything.

With Alexander and Porcelain Black, he wrote the track "How Do You Love Someone?" for Ashley Tisdale's 2009 album Guilty Pleasure. In 2010, Steinberg and Alexander wrote "What Happened to Us" for Australian singer Jessica Mauboy for her album Get 'Em Girls. With Alexander and Toby Gad, he wrote the 2011 song "Don't Hold Your Breath" for Nicole Scherzinger, and with Alexander and Rivers Cuomo he wrote the 2011 song "High Maintenance" for Miranda Cosgrove. Steinberg and Alexander also wrote and produced the hit song "Give Your Heart a Break" by Demi Lovato. he wrote the 2016 song "My Stupid Heart" for Tini Stoessel.

Appearance in film
Steinberg performs an acoustic version of "I Touch Myself" in an on camera interview in the documentary film Sticky: A (Self) Love Story.

Awards and honors
Steinberg was awarded a Golden Palm Star on the Palm Springs Walk of Stars in 2008.

Steinberg and Kelly were inducted as a team into the Songwriters Hall of Fame in 2011.

References

External links
Official website
Songfacts interview with Billy Steinberg

1950 births
Living people
Writers from Palm Springs, California
Jewish American songwriters
Songwriters from California
Bard College alumni
Place of birth missing (living people)
Grammy Award winners
21st-century American Jews